Daphne Jessie Akhurst (22 April 1903 – 9 January 1933) known also by her married name Daphne Cozens, was an Australian tennis player.

Akhurst won the women's singles title at the Australian Championships five times between 1925 and 1930. According to Wallis Myers (The Daily Telegraph, Daily Mail), she was ranked World No. 3 in 1928.

Career
The second daughter of Oscar James Akhurst, a lithographer, and his wife Jessie Florence (née Smith), Daphne Akhurst won the women's singles title at the Australian Championships five times, in 1925, 1926, 1928, 1929, and 1930. She is fourth on the list of most women's singles titles at the Australian Championships; behind only Margaret Court with eleven titles, Serena Williams with seven and Nancye Wynne Bolton with six titles. She won the women's doubles title at the Australian Championships five times: in 1924 and 1925 with Sylvia Lance Harper, in 1928 with Esna Boyd Robertson, and in 1929 and 1931 with Louie Bickerton. She and Marjorie Cox were the runners-up in 1926. 

In 1925 she was part of the first Australian women's team to tour Europe and reached the quarterfinal of the singles event at Wimbledon which she lost to Joan Fry. During her second and last European tour in 1928, she reached the singles quarterfinal at the French Championships, in which Cristobel Hardie defeated her, and the semifinal at Wimbledon, which she lost in straight sets to Lili de Alvarez.

Akhurst won the mixed doubles title at the Australian Championships four times: in 1924 and 1925 with Jim Willard, in 1928 with Jean Borotra, and in 1929 with Gar Moon. She and Willard were the runners-up in 1926. She and her partner Jack Crawford reached the mixed doubles final at Wimbledon in 1928, but lost to the team of Elizabeth Ryan/Patrick Spence, 7–5, 6–4.

Akhurst won the singles title at the German Championships in 1928 after a three-sets victory in the final against defending champion Cilly Aussem.

Personal life
Akhurst attended the Miss. E. Tildesley's Normanhurst School, followed by the Sydney Conservatorium of Music. On 26 February 1930 at St Philip's Church of England, Sydney, Daphne Akhurst married Royston Stuckey Cozens, a tobacco manufacturer, and retired from serious competition soon after winning the Australian ladies' doubles championship in 1931. They had one son, Don.

Daphne Akhurst Cozens died on 9 January 1933, aged 29, from an ectopic pregnancy.

Legacy
Since 1934 the trophy presented each year to the winner of the women's singles at the Australian Open is named the Daphne Akhurst Memorial Cup in her honour. She was inducted into the Australian Tennis Hall of Fame on Australia Day (26 January), 2006. She was inducted into the International Tennis Hall of Fame in 2013.

Grand Slam finals

Singles: 5 titles

Doubles: 6 (5 titles, 1 runner-up)

Mixed Doubles: 6 (4 titles, 2 runners-up)

Grand Slam singles tournament timeline

1The French Championships were not held in 1924, as the Olympics were held in Paris that year.

See also
 Performance timelines for all female tennis players who reached at least one Grand Slam final

References

Further reading

External links
 
 

1903 births
1933 deaths
Australasian Championships (tennis) champions
Australian Championships (tennis) champions
Australian female tennis players
Grand Slam (tennis) champions in mixed doubles
Grand Slam (tennis) champions in women's singles
Grand Slam (tennis) champions in women's doubles
People from the Inner West (Sydney)
Sportswomen from New South Wales
Tennis players from Sydney
International Tennis Hall of Fame inductees
Deaths in childbirth
20th-century Australian women